Cuthona methana is a species of sea slug in the family Tergipedidae. It is small, only 4 to 6 millimeters in length, with long gills.

C. methana was discovered on a seafloor at Hydrate Ridge, with layers of methane hydrate, which is a mixture of seawater and methane. It was named for being discovered near methane bubbling out of the seafloor, giving the species name "methana".

References 

Gastropods described in 2018
Tergipedidae
Molluscs of the Pacific Ocean